The 2018 CAFA Women's Championship is the first edition of the CAFA Women's Championship, an association football tournament for women's national teams from the Central Asian Football Association. It is hosted in Tashkent, Uzbekistan and be played between 23 November and 1 December 2018.

Uzbekistan won the title undefeated.

Teams
All CAFA members but Turkmenistan entered. Afghanistan appeared  with kind of a B-team after several players including the captain refused to sign a contract pre-tournament.

League table
Match order drawn on 22 November.

Fixtures

Awards
 Topscorer: Nilufar Kudratova (Uzbekistan) 
 Fair Play: Tajikistan
 Most Valuable Player: Lyudmila Karachik (Uzbekistan)

References

External links

CAFA Women's Championship
2018 in women's association football
International women's association football competitions hosted by Uzbekistan
November 2018 sports events in Asia
December 2018 sports events in Asia